The 6th Bangladesh National Film Awards, presented by Ministry of Information, Bangladesh to felicitate the best of Bangladeshi Cinema released in the year 1980. Bangladesh National Film Awards is a film award ceremony in Bangladesh established in 1975 by Government of Bangladesh.  A national panel appointed by the government selects the winning entry, and the award ceremony is held in Dhaka. 1980 was the 6th ceremony of Bangladesh National Film Award.

List of winners
This year awards were given in 18 categories.

Merit awards

Technical awards

See also
 Bachsas Awards
 Meril Prothom Alo Awards
 Ifad Film Club Award
 Babisas Award

References

External links

National Film Awards (Bangladesh) ceremonies
Bangladesh National Film Awards
Bangladesh National Film Awards
Bangladesh National Film Awards